South Sudan Radio is a South Sudanese radio station owned by the Government of South Sudan. It operates AM radio stations in Juba, Wau, Bentiu and Malakal. It also operates FM stations in Juba, Wau, Bentiu, Malakal, Bor, Torit, Kwajok, Yambio and Rumbek.

Radio stations in South Sudan